Gao Xiang (Chinese: 高翔; 1688–1753) was a Qing Chinese painter, and one of the Eight Eccentrics of Yangzhou. He was born in Ganquan in Yangzhou prefecture.

References

External links
Gao Xiang in the collection of the Metropolitan Museum, New York

1688 births
1753 deaths
Qing dynasty painters
Painters from Yangzhou